Pecado de amor is a Mexican telenovela produced by Ernesto Alonso for Televisa in 1978.

Cast 
Jacqueline Andere as Paula Otero / Chantal Luque
Ernesto Alonso as Miguel Angel
Enrique Álvarez Félix as Alberto
Carmen Montejo as Cristina Otero
Héctor Gómez as Raul
Alfredo Leal as Jaime Leon
Gonzalo Vega as Walter
Nelly Meden as Victoria
Yolanda Ciani as Beatriz
Martha Zavaleta as Rosa
Angélica Chain as Lina
Rocio Brambila as Gina
Yolanda Lievana as Fanny
Agustin Sauret as Alfonso
Alfonso Meza as Ramon
Felipe Gil as Nino
Ignacio Rubiell as Nacho
Toni Saldaña as Toni
Silvia Suarez as Eloisa

References

External links 
Web site

Mexican telenovelas
1978 telenovelas
Televisa telenovelas
Spanish-language telenovelas
1978 Mexican television series debuts
1978 Mexican television series endings